Joseph Lau Luen-hung (born 21 July 1951) is a Hong Kong billionaire. Lau is the former chairman of property developer Chinese Estates. He is an avid art and wine collector. His fortune is estimated by Forbes at $13.3 billion as of September 2021. In 2014, he became a convicted felon and fugitive in Macau.

Life and career
Joseph Lau was born on July 19, 1951 in Hong Kong. He has a younger brother Thomas and two younger sisters. Lau attended the University of Windsor in Canada before returning to join his family's business making electric fans in 1974. In 1978, he renamed the company Evergo Industrial Enterprise. In 1982, the company held an initial public offering in Hong Kong. In 1985, Lau switched Evergo's business focus to investment-holding and property-management services.

Lau became the majority shareholder of Chinese Estates Holdings when he acquired a 43% stake in the company through Evergo in 1986. Since then, he's expanded his real estate investments through a series of acquisitions. In 2000, he acquired 67% stake in Chi Cheung Investment.

Chinese Estates Holdings developed The ONE, the tallest retail complex in Hong Kong, which opened in 2010. In 2017, Lau gifted the property to his wife Kimbie Chan Hoi-wan and their children.

In March 2014, Lau resigned from his positions as chairman and CEO of Chinese Estates after a Macau court convicted him of bribery and money laundering. His son Lau Ming-wai acceded to the chairmanship of the company. Sue Chan, the elder sister of Lau's wife Kimbie, became the chief executive of the company Lau founded.

Art and wine collections 
Lau is an avid art collector. He ranks among ARTnews's list of the "Top 200 Collectors." In 2017, Forbes has estimated the total value of his art collection at around a $1 billion.

Lau purchased Everything Must Go (1984) by Jean-Michel Basquiat for $250,000 in the 1990s. In 2006, Lau purchased Andy Warhol's Mao (1977), a portrait of Mao Zedong, for $17.4 million at Christie's. In 2007, Lau purchased Paul Gauguin's Te Poipoi (The Morning) (1892), a painting of a Tahitian scene, for $39.2 million at a Sotheby's auction.

In February 2020, Lau offered his David Hockney painting The Splash (1966) at Sotheby’s contemporary art sale in London. The painting sold for $29.9 million, which is the third highest price ever achieved for a Hockney at auction.

Lau owns a collection of more than 10,000 bottles of red wine. In October 2020, the sales of Lau's French wines at Sotheby's in Hong Kong brought a total of $6.8 million, more than doubling pre-sale expectations. Following the success of the sale, Lau sold 147 lots (533 bottles in total) again at Sotheby's in Hong Kong. The sale brought a total of $6.8 million, also doubling its pre-sale estimate.

Personal life
Lau married Bo Wing-kam (1954–2003) in 1977 and they were divorced in 1992. They had two children: a son, Lau Ming-wai (born 1979 Dec) and daughter Jade Lau Sau-yung (born 1983). In 2008, Lau Ming-wai's wife gave birth to twins, they are Lau's eldest grandchildren. Lau Ming-wai, a British citizen, is vice-chairman of Chinese Estates Group and is both chairman of the government's Commission on Youth and on the steering committee of the HK$10 billion Community Care Fund, established in 2010. He was formerly a member of the Commission on Poverty. In 2011, he was part of Henry Tang's election team for the 2012 chief executive election.

Lau had five additional children with two women concurrently out of wedlock, two with Yvonne Lui and three with Kimbee Chan (aka Chan Hoi-wan).

In May 2007, Lau was revealed to be among the first seven purchasers of a Boeing 787 Dreamliner jet for private use.

In 2009, Lau bought a 7.03 carat blue diamond for his daughter Josephine, that he named the "Star of Josephine" at Sotheby's for $9.5 million.

In November 2015, Lau bought two expensive diamonds for his 7-year old daughter Josephine. On 10 November, he bought a 16.08 carat pink diamond at Christie's for $28.5 million. The next day, Lau bought a 12.03 carat blue diamond at Sotheby's for $48.4 million, setting new records for the most expensive jewel sold at auction and the most expensive diamond ever. He subsequently renamed them the "Sweet Josephine" and the "Blue Moon of Josephine" respectively after his daughter.

On 7 December 2016, Lau married Kimbee Chan in Hong Kong.
In 2017, citing serious health issues, the business tycoon has transferred his 75% shares in Chinese Estates to his new wife and his son.

Legal issues
On 31 May 2012, the Macau Court of Final Appeal confirmed that Lau and Steven Lo were involved in the case of offering Macau's former public works chief Ao Man-long HK$20 million over the bid for five plots of land opposite Macau International Airport. Lau and Lo were charged with bribery and money laundering. They both denied the charges and Lo earlier told the court that the HK$20 million was a preliminary payment to construction company San Meng Fai.

On 14 March 2014 Lau and Lo were found guilty of the charges against them in Macau's Court of First Instance. Lau was sentenced to five years and three months in prison, but he appealed. However, on 19 July 2015, the Court of Second Instance rejected his and Lo's appeals and let the length of their prison terms stand. Lau has so far evaded extradition and remains as a fugitive at large, as Macau and Hong Kong do not have an extradition treaty.

References

External link

1951 births
Fugitives
Hong Kong billionaires
Hong Kong chief executives
Hong Kong criminals
Hong Kong financial businesspeople
Hong Kong philanthropists
Hong Kong real estate businesspeople
Living people
University of Windsor alumni